Veelikse may refer to several places in Estonia:

Veelikse, Pärnu County, village in Saarde Parish, Pärnu County
Veelikse, Viljandi County, village in Abja Parish, Viljandi County